The Muttahida Qaumi Movement (MQM), previously known as Muhajir Qaumi Movement, is a secular political party in Pakistan that was founded by Altaf Hussain in 1984. Currently the party is split between 2 main factions. MQM-London faction is controlled by Altaf Hussain from London, while MQM-Pakistan is run by Saeed Bharam and Khalid Maqbool Siddiqui based in Pakistan. Its electoral symbol was a kite.

It was founded as a student organization, All Pakistan Muhajir Student Organization (APMSO), in 1978 by Altaf Hussain. APMSO gave birth to the Muhajir Qaumi Movement in 1984. In 1997, the MQM removed the term Muhajir (which denoted the party's roots among the country's Urdu-speaking community) from its name and replaced it with Muttahida ("United"). The MQM is generally known as a party that once held strong mobilizing potential in Karachi, having traditionally been the dominant political force in the city.

The party has kept its influence over Pakistan's federal government as a key coalition partner since the late 1980s (1988-1990, 1990–1992, 2002–2007, 2008–2013). However, in 2015, MQM parliamentarians resigned from the National Assembly, Senate and Provincial Assembly of Sindh in protest against a crackdown on party supporters.

In August 2016, after Saeed Bharam's 22 August speech, there was military crack down on the party. Nine Zero, the party headquarters in Karachi, was sealed, the party's leaders including Farooq Sattar were arrested, and most elected parliamentarians in the MQM were forced to disassociate themselves from Altaf Hussain. MQM terminated Farooq Sattar's party membership for party rules violations, and he then formed his own faction.

Background 
Muhajirs were mostly Muslims, who migrated to Pakistan when the country was created after independence of British India in 1947. Karachi was then home to a very diverse set of ethnicities including Urdu and Gujarati speaking immigrants, Punjabis, Pashtuns, Baluch and foreigners from several South Asian countries. Muhajirs advanced in commerce and the bureaucracy, but many resented the quota system which facilitated Sindhis in gaining university slots and civil service jobs. It was this very ethnic rivalry that led to Muhajir political mobilization, which was further provoked by the stagnant economy and the condition of Biharis in Bangladesh concentration camps.

Another major contributing factor behind the political mobilization of MQM among the Muhajirs was a feeling of insecurity due to the mass arrival of weaponry in Karachi during the Soviet-Afghan war and criminal groups proceeding to incite ethnic riots between Pashtuns and the Muhajirs throughout the 1980's.

History

Founding 

The first political organization of Muhajirs, called All Pakistan Muhajir Student Organization (APMSO), was founded on 11 June 1978 by Altaf Hussain in Karachi University. On March 18, 1984, the APMSO evolved into a proper political organization—Muhajir Qaumi Movement. It was launched to protect the Muhajir community who perceived themselves as the victims of discrimination and repression by the quota system that gave preference to certain ethnicities for admissions in educational institutions and employment in civil services.

Late 1986 to 1990 
In its early years, MQM drew enormous crowds, the epitome of which was the rally of August 8, 1986 at Nishtar Park, Karachi. Three years into its existence, MQM won the November 1987 local body elections in Karachi and Hyderabad and had several mayors win unopposed. Pakistan Peoples Party (PPP) won the highest number of seats in the general election of 1988 and formed a coalition government in the Sindh Province with the help of MQM, which then had a larger mandate in urban Sindh in comparison to PPP whose majority of support came from rural areas of Sindh. A 59-point agreement, called the Karachi Accord, was signed which included statements about protection of the democratic system and political rights, urban development goals, and creating objective criteria for admission to universities and colleges. Within a few months of the agreement, differences surfaced and MQM ministers in the Sindh Cabinet resigned because the agreement was not implemented. Thus, the alliance broke up in October 1989 and MQM joined hands with PPP's opponents. During these times MQM made mark for public benefit initiatives. Khidmat-e-Khalq Committee, a social welfare initiative, was founded in 1978 which in 1998 transformed into Khidmat-e-Khalq Foundation (KKF).

1990 to 1999 
In the elections of October 1990, MQM emerged as the third strongest party in the country. This time, it made its alliance with Islami Jamhoori Ittehad (IJI) to establish a provincial government in Sindh whereas IJI formed the federal government. During these times, small factions of MQM separated themselves on the main body of the party, and the largest among these factions was MQM Haqiqi, which was formed by Afaq Ahmad and Amir Khan. It is generally believed that MQM Haqiqi was formed by the collusion of Pakistani Government in power and the Establishment/Inter-Services Intelligence (ISI) to weaken MQM and was supported by successive federal governments and the military. In the years to come, federal governments switched between forming alliance with MQM and fighting against it to establish greater control over Karachi.

From 1992 to 1994, the MQM was the target of the Pakistan Army's Operation Clean-up, The period is regarded as the bloodiest period in Karachi's history, with thousands MQM Leaders/workers and supporters killed or gone missing. Although more than 20 years have passed since the alleged arrest or disappearance of MQM workers, families of the missing people are still hopeful after registering the cases in the Supreme Court of Pakistan. The operation left thousands of Muhajir civilians dead.

The violence gripped urban Sindh politics in the late 1980s after General Zia ul-Haq's era, and finally in 1992, the erstwhile government of Prime Minister Nawaz Sharif passed a resolution in assembly to launch a military operation in Karachi to target 72 'big fishes'. The federal government gave the reasoning behind this operation, known as "Operation Clean-up", as the government's attempt to end terrorism in Karachi and to seize unauthorized arms. Operation Clean-Up, which ostensibly sought to eliminate all terrorists irrespective of their political affiliation, began in June 1992. MQM perceived this operation as an attempt to wipe out the party altogether. Political violence erupted while MQM organized protests and strikes. The resulting lawlessness prevailed in the largest metropolitan city of Pakistan, which led to the country's president dissolving the National Assembly.

During the 1992 violence Saeed Bharam left the country when a warrant was issued for him in connection with a murder. Since then, the political party is run by Mr Bharam, from self-imposed exile in London.

MQM boycotted the subsequent 1993 general elections claiming organized military intimidation but participated in provincial elections. MQM secured 27 seats in provincial assembly, in comparison to its political rival PPP which won 56 seats. This resulted in PPP forming both the provincial and federal governments. Whereas, MQM Haqiqi failed to gain any seats at federal or provincial level. Political violence gained momentum in 1993 and 1994. During the 1994 violence, heavily political killings were reported between MQM, MQM factions, and Sindhi nationalist groups. By July 1995, more than 1,800 people had been assassinated in Karachi. In 1997, MQM boycotted the general elections and officially changed the previously maintained name 'Muhajir' to 'Muttahida'().

Accusations of violence 
In the mid-1990s, MQM created widespread political violence that affected Pakistan's Sindh province, particularly Karachi, the port city that is the country's commercial capital. In the mid-1990s, the U.S. State Department, Amnesty International, and others accused the MQM and a rival faction, MQM Haqiqi, of summary killings, torture, and other abuses. The MQM-A routinely denied involvement in violence.

The party's use of extra-legal activities in conflicts with political opponents have earned it the accusation of terrorism. The party's strongly hierarchical order and personalist leadership style led to some critics labelling the MQM as fascist.

Jinnahpur Conspiracy 
During Operation Clean-up, MQM was accused of being anti-Pakistan and of planning a separatist break-away state, Jinnahpur. However, later some senior army officers, Brigadier (R) Imtiaz and General (R) Naseer Akhtar, confessed that Jinnahpur was "nothing but a drama" against MQM for the military operation and there was no map of Jinnahpur.

On October 19, 1992, Pakistani newspapers carried an ISPR press release, conveying Army's denial of the knowledge of the Jinnahpur plan. The ISPR, the public relations arm of the Pakistan Army stated, "The Army had no evidence concerning the so-called Jinnahpur plan, it is clarified that the newspaper story in question is baseless. The Army has neither handed over to the government any document or map as reported, nor is it in possession of any evidence concerning the so-called Jinnahpur Plan. It is also factually wrong that the matter was discussed at any meeting of the corps commander." Asif Zardari who was then President of Pakistan is said to have "said in a court premises in Karachi that the Jinnahpur scandal was created to malign the MQM."

2001 to present 
In 2001, MQM boycotted the local body elections but in the 2002 general elections, MQM won 17 out of 272 seats in national assembly.

In 2008 elections, MQM won 25 seats in the National Assembly of Pakistan and 52 seats in the Provincial Assembly of Sindh.

In 2013, the Muttahida Qaumi Movement (MQM) filed a Rs 5 billion defamation suit against Pakistan Tehreek-i-Insaf chairman Imran Khan at the Sindh High Court for issuing statements against MQM chief Altaf Hussain. MQM was also threatened by Taliban.

In June 2014, the Metropolitan Police raided the London home of its leader, Saeed Bharam, on suspicion of money-laundering.

In 2008, Foreign Policy released a Global Cities Index which named Mustafa Kamal as Mayor of the Moment, but Kamal gave all credit to Altaf Hussain.

The party has won majority in the local government election of Karachi and Hyderabad and brought its mayor in Karachi Metropolitan Corporation (KMC) and Hyderabad Municipal Corporation. The mayor of Karachi, Wasim Akhtar has been put behind bars without any charge by anti terror court and is waiting Sindh High Court to grant him bail in order to resume his office as the mayor of Karachi. MQM has also brought its chairman and vice chairman in the municipal committee of fourth largest city of Sindh Mirpurkhas.

Election Boycott 2018 
MQM and its leader Saeed Bharam decided to boycott elections in 2018 due to military intervention in political affairs, MQM-P which is a separate party now would instead contest for elections using traditional MQM symbol kite. This would be the second boycott of general elections after 1993 and third boycott of all elections including local bodies election in 2001. The average turnout of Karachi constituencies was 40.4% in 2018 elections comparing to 55 percent in 2013.

Party structure 
The party is led by Saeed Bharam under whose supervision, members of the Rabita Committee (also known as Central Coordination Committee) formulate the party's political program. It consists of 24 members from Pakistan and 10 from London, United Kingdom. The party's Karachi-based organizational operations are held under its Karachi Tanzeemi Committee.

On 20 November 2011, Muttahida Qaumi Movement announced the formation of Central Executive Committee with its members drawn from Azad Jammu & Kashmir, Gilgit-Baltistan, Punjab, Khyber Pakhtoonkhawa, Balochistan and Sindh. Addressing a Press Conference, Farooq Sattar, a senior MQM official, told that the purpose of Central Executive Committee is to assist MQM Coordination Committee and the party in organizational matters, policy-making and preparation of manifesto.

MQM has several chapters across the world in the United States, Canada, South Africa, several European countries, and Japan. Currently, the heads of MQM North America are former Federal Minister Khalid Maqbool Siddiqui and Ibad Rehman.

Controversy 
MQM's Party leadership faced widespread arrests after Altaf Hussain's controversial speech and later attack on ARY channel which faced much criticism from the media and particularly from the establishment which was discontented by his words:'Pakistan Murdabad' (Death to Pakistan). On the orders of Chief of Army Staff General Raheel Sharif Paramilitary forces immediately sealed MQM offices including Nine Zero. MQM's deputy convenor Shahid Pasha, parliamentary leader Farooq Sattar, Sindh assembly opposition leader Izhar ul Hasan and Rabita Committee members Qamar Mansur and Member National Assembly and ex Hyderabad Mayor Kanwar Naveed Jameel were arrested. Farooq Sattar who was released shortly, later disassociated himself from MQM founder and leader Altaf Hussain saying his statements were unacceptable and later presented and facilitated resolutions in Federal and provincial assemblies against his controversial speech, Farooq also claimed to strip MQM chief from constitution and powers. The crack down against MQM took a rapid turn when over hundred MQM Unit and Sector offices have been demolished and many MQM workers rounded up.

On August 21, 2016, according to Election Commission of Pakistan, Nadeem Nusrat and not Farooq sattar was the leader of MQM. and According to Nadeem Nusrat, Minus Altaf formula is not acceptable.

MQM leadership in Sindh Assembly declared that it wants MQM leader Altaf Hussain tried for high treason and also removed Nadeem Nusrat, Convenor of the party along with Wasay Jaleel, Mustafa Azizabadi etc.

On 22 September 2016, MQM convenor Nadeem Nusrat termed the moves of Farooq Sattar against party rules and illegal and emphasized he is an elected Convenor and dissolved entire party infrastructure including Rabita Committee and ordered mass resignation of MQM parliamentarians from assemblies and to contest new elections on their own.

In a media conference the spokesman for the United States State Department, John Kirby, stated that US was aware of the arrests of the MQM leaders and was closely monitoring the events.

Naming controversy 
Although media refers to Muttahida Qaumi Movement as MQM-London, MQM has instructed media to use the original name Muttahida Qaumi Movement only where as Farooq Sattar led faction has adopted the name MQM-Pakistan.

Karachi Baldia Town factory
A private garment factory lit on fire and the flames ignited chemicals that were stored in the factory. The Baldia Town factory inferno case took a dramatic turn on Friday 7 Feb 2015 when a report by Rangers claimed that the MQM was behind the deadly fire that claimed the lives of at least 258 factory workers.
MQM set fire factory to take Extortion money from owners.
A documentary film is prepared on Factory fire name Discount workers in year 2020

State Operations against MQM

Pakka Qila Operation (26, 27 May 1990) 
Operation was launched by Sindh Police to target MQM workers in Pakka Qilla Hyderabad. Over 250 besieged innocent men, women, children was massacred during the operation which carried on for 275 hours before Pakistan army men eventually moved in.

Operation Clean-up (1992 - 1994) 
Operation clean-up was started by late general Asif Nawaz after Jinnahpur conspiracy and major kaleem torture case.

Operation (1994-1996) 
During tenure of Benazir Bhutto, interior minister General Naseerullah Babar conducted second operation against MQM between 1994 and 1996.

Due to serious doubts over credibility of operation due to fake encounters, extra judicial killings and rise of killings in Karachi, Benazir Bhutto's government was dismissed by the then President of Pakistan, Farooq Ahmed Laghari.

Operation (1998) 
In the aftermath of Hakeem Saeed's assassination, governor rule was imposed by Nawaz Sharif in the Sindh province and military operation was initiated against MQM,

Karachi Targeted Action (2013 - present) 
Due to rise in Target killing and organised crimes of extortion, kidnapping for ransom and increased crime rate of the city, Karachi operation began by the Nawaz Sharif government in 2013 with the intention of creating peace in the city. Even though it was claimed by the interior minister Chaudhry Nisar that the intentions of the operation were apolitical, there have been systematic crackdowns against MQM. In 2015 MQM's Headquarter Nine Zero was raided twice by the paramilitary Rangers and many top officials of MQM were taken into custody. On August 22, 2016, The Headquarter was sealed and hundreds of MQM offices were bulldozed.

Many Journalists opine that Army establishment is behind the formation of PSP and MQM-Pakistan. Many MQM officials including Prof. Zafar Arif, Kanwar Khalid Yunus, adv Sathi ishaq, Amjadullah khan, Qamar Mansur, Shahid Pasha have been in detention since four months.

MNA Kanwar Naveed Jameed, MPA Kamran farooqui have also been arrested by the paramilitary forces.

Human Rights Violations by the state 
1994-1996 targeted actions saw gross human rights violations by the state organisations which included kidnapping for random, extrajudicial executions, disappearance, torture, fake encounters etc.

The speeches and images of Saeed Bharam have been banned by the decision of Lahore High Court's justice Naqvi and Anti-Terror court has issued arrest warrants of Saeed Bharam numerous times.

Renowned journalists have accepted that targeted operations are only against MQM.

During Nine Zero raid, MQM worker Waqas Shah was brutally shot down by Ranger's 9mm pistol fire from point blank range. The video evidence released on electronic media confirmed the incident.

Farooq Sattar's coordination officer Syed Aftab Ahmed was killed while in the custody of paramilitary forces. Initially the force denied torture and stated that he died of heart attack but it had to accept after social media publicised videos of torture marks on Aftab's body and autopsy report conforming death due to torture.

As a result of operation, MQM claims 67 of its workers have been extra judicially murdered the paramilitary force while 150 are still missing and more than 5,000 are behind bars. The Amnesty International, US state department, United Nations Human rights commission has published several documents highlighting gross human rights violations during the targeted operation against MQM.

Electoral history

Post split election campaigns 
MQM took part in local bodies by election from Union Committee 46 Hyderabad which was vacated by the death of counselor as independent candidate. MQM supported independent candidate Asif Baig defeated the candidate of MQM-Pakistan by a healthy margin.

References

Further reading 
Human Rights Watch (HRW). WORLD REPORT 1998, "Pakistan" (Dec 1997), https://www.hrw.org/worldreport/Asia-09.htm#P823_214912
"MQM brings ahead common man in polls: Chief Justice Iftikhar Muhammad Chaudhry", Pakistan State Times (2012 April 10)

External links 
MQM Official Website
MQM USA Official Website
MQM UK Official Website

 
Political parties established in 1984
Liberal parties in Pakistan
Political parties of minorities
Politics of Karachi
Muttahida Qaumi Movement – London
Muttahida Qaumi Movement politicians
Muttahida Qaumi Movement MPAs (Sindh)